Mary Krebs-Brenning (5 December 1851 – 27 June 1900) was a German woman pianist.

Life 

Born in Dresden, Krebs-Brenning was the daughter of the opera singer Aloyse Michalesi and the Royal Saxon Court Kapellmeister Karl August Krebs. Her sister was the actress Antonie Maria Krebs (1845-1918), who was married to the actor and director Fedo von Jarosch (1835-1918).

Her father taught his daughter to play the piano from the age of six. Her first concert in 1863 in the former  in Dresden was followed by numerous concerts in Leipzig, Hamburg and England.

She was considered a "child prodigy" and was appointed royal chamber virtuoso by King John of Saxony at the age of 13. In October 1870, she embarked on a concert tour to America, traversing the United States in two years. Many authoritative critics of the time regarded her as the "first" German pianist of her time. According to the critics, her greatness was based on the right measure. She accompanied, among others, the soprano Adelina Patti on the piano and made music together with Anton Rubinstein as well as the Königliche Hofkapelle and the Gewerbeorchester.

Trips to England, Saint Petersburg and Moscow followed. Her grave is designed as a stele with a portrait medallion.

Honours 
Already during her lifetime, the street where Krebs lived was given the name Mary-Krebs-Straße when Strehlen was incorporated into Dresden in 1892.

References

Further reading 
 Krebs, Mary. In Volker Klimpel: Berühmte Dresdner. Hellerau-Verlag, Dresden 2002, .

External links 
 
 Anja Herold: Lexikon-Artikel „Krebs, Mary, verh. Brenning“. In Europäische Instrumentalistinnen des 18. und 19. Jahrhunderts. 2009. Online-Lexikon des Sophie Drinker Instituts, edited by Freia Hoffmann.
 Silke Wenzel: Artikel „Mary Krebs“. In MUGI. Musikvermittlung und Genderforschung: Lexikon und multimediale Präsentationen, edited by Beatrix Borchard and Nina Noeske, Hochschule für Musik und Theater Hamburg, 2003ff. As of 23 November 2017

German classical pianists
1851 births
1900 deaths
Women classical pianists
Musicians from Dresden